Stenorache is a monotypic moth genus of the family Noctuidae. Its only species, Stenorache nubilosa, is found in the Indian state of Himachal Pradesh. Both the genus and species were first described by George Hampson, the genus in 1910 and the species 16 years earlier in 1894.

References

Acontiinae
Monotypic moth genera